Phasmosomus is a genus of dirt-colored seed bugs in the family Rhyparochromidae, the sole genus in the tribe Phasmosomini. There are at least two described species in Phasmosomus.

Species
These two species belong to the genus Phasmosomus:
 Phasmosomus araxis Kiritshenko, 1938
 Phasmosomus priesneri (Wagner, 1958)

References

Rhyparochromidae